Contracts of Employment (Indigenous Workers) Convention, 1939 (shelved) is  an International Labour Organization Convention.

It was established in 1939:
Having decided upon the adoption of certain proposals with regard to the regulation of contracts of employment of indigenous workers,...

Ratifications
Prior to its shelving, the convention was ratified by 31 states.

External links 
Text.
Ratifications.

Shelved International Labour Organization conventions
Treaties concluded in 1939
Treaties entered into force in 1948